Pongara National Park is a national park in Gabon near the capital Libreville, on the south side of the Gabon Estuary and the Atlantic Ocean. It covers an area of 929km2. The national park is composed chiefly of moist tropical forests and mangrove forests.

Description
The site is largely forested and contains a range of habitats including mangrove forest, swamp forest, riverine forest and seasonally-inundated forest. There is also a long strip of sandy beach area and some grassy savanna. Several rivers flow through the park into the estuary, including the River Remboué, the River Igombiné and the River Gomgoué.

Flora
The mangrove forests are dominated by Avicennia and Rhizophora species, and these and the golden leather fern (Acrostichum aureum) help stabilise the habitat and slow down water flow. People have been living here since at least the Neolithic era and gather timber, grow cassava and banana, and hunt and fish.

Fauna
Elephants, gorillas, monkeys, buffaloes, duikers and chimpanzees are present in the rainforest, Hawksbill sea turtles (Eretmochelys imbricata), green sea turtles (Chelonia mydas) and olive ridley sea turtle (Lepidochelys olivacea) visit the estuary and the beaches are used by leatherback sea turtles for breeding. A local conservation organisation monitors the female leatherback turtles as they come ashore to lay their eggs, tags them, guards the nests, operates a turtle hatchery and provides ecological education for the local populace. Many migratory birds visit the estuary and up to 10,000 waders overwinter there.

References

External links 
Virtual Tour of the National Parks

National parks of Gabon
Protected areas established in 2002
2002 establishments in Gabon
Ramsar sites in Gabon